Stan Getz With Guest Artist Laurindo Almeida is an album by American saxophonist Stan Getz and guitarist Laurindo Almeida, recorded in 1963 and issued on Verve as V/V6-8665.

Track listing
"Menina Moça (Young Lady)" (Luiz Antônio) - 5:41
"Once Again (Outra Vez)" (Antônio Carlos Jobim) - 6:42
"Winter Moon" (Laurindo Almeida, Portia Nelson) - 5:20
"Do What You Do, Do" (Almeida, Jeanne Taylor) - 4:35
"Samba Da Sahra" (Almeida) - 4:54
"Maracatu-Too" (Almeida, Getz) - 5:00

"Corcovado" (Antônio Carlos Jobim) Bonus track to first edition version of CD

Tracks 2, 5, 6 recorded on March 21, 1963; #1, 3, 4 on March 22, 1963.

Personnel
Stan Getz - tenor saxophone
Laurindo Almeida - guitar
George Duvivier - bass
José Paulo, Luiz Parga - (percussion track 6 only)
Dave Bailey, or Edison Machado, or Jose Soorez - drums
Steve Kuhn - piano (tracks 1&6)

References 

Verve Records albums
Stan Getz albums
1966 albums
albums produced by Creed Taylor